The 2012 Citi Open (known as such for sponsorship reasons) was a tennis tournament played on outdoor hard courts. It was the 44th edition (for the men) and the 2nd edition (for the women) of the event known that year as the Citi Open (previously known on the men's tour as the Legg Mason Tennis Classic), and was part of the ATP World Tour 500 series of the 2012 ATP World Tour, and of the WTA International tournaments of the 2012 WTA Tour. It took place at the William H.G. FitzGerald Tennis Center in Washington, D.C., United States, from July 29 to August 5, 2012, running concurrently with the tennis event at the London Summer Olympics.

ATP singles main-draw entrants

Seeds
The following players were seeded in the main singles draw, following the ATP rankings of July 23, 2012:

Other entrants
The following players received wild cards into the main singles draw:
  Brian Baker
  Ričardas Berankis 
  Steve Johnson

The following players received entry from the singles qualifying draw:
  Marco Chiudinelli
  Jesse Levine
  Michael Russell
  Florent Serra

ATP doubles main-draw entrants

Seeds

 Rankings are as of July 23, 2012

Other entrants
The following pairs received wildcards into the doubles main draw:
  James Blake /  Tim Smyczek
  Drew Courtney /  Steve Johnson
The following pair received entry as alternates:
  Jamie Delgado /  Ken Skupski

Withdrawals
  David Marrero (finger injury)

WTA singles main-draw entrants

Seeds
The following players were seeded in the main singles draw, following the WTA rankings of July 23, 2012:

Other entrants
The following players received wild cards into the main singles draw:
  Eugenie Bouchard 
  Camila Giorgi 
  CoCo Vandeweghe

The following players received entry from the singles qualifying draw:
  Jana Čepelová
  Jennifer Elie
  Michelle Larcher de Brito
  Aravane Rezaï

Withdrawals
  Ayumi Morita (lower back injury)
  Romina Oprandi 
  Virginie Razzano (right hip injury)

WTA doubles main-draw entrants

Seeds

1 Rankings are as of July 23, 2012

Other entrants
The following pair received wildcard into the doubles main draw:
  Simone Kalhorn /  Alessondra Parra

Retirements
  Karin Knapp (knee pain)

Finals

Men's singles

 Alexandr Dolgopolov defeated  Tommy Haas, 6–7(7–9), 6–4, 6–1
It was Dolgopolov's first singles title of the year, and the second of his career.

Women's singles

 Magdaléna Rybáriková defeated  Anastasia Pavlyuchenkova, 6–1, 6–1
It was Rybáriková's first singles title of the year, and the third of her career.

Men's doubles

 Treat Conrad Huey /  Dominic Inglot defeated  Kevin Anderson /  Sam Querrey, 7–6(9–7), 6–7(9–11), [10–5]
It was Huey's first doubles title of the year, and of his career.
It was Inglot's first doubles title of the year, and of his career.

Women's doubles

 Shuko Aoyama /  Chang Kai-chen defeated  Irina Falconi /  Chanelle Scheepers, 7–5, 6–2
It was Aoyama's first doubles title of the year, and of her career.
It was Chang's second doubles title of the year, and the third of her career.

References

External links
 Official website
 

2012 WTA Tour
2012 US Open Series
2012
2012 in sports in Washington, D.C.
July 2012 sports events in the United States
August 2012 sports events in the United States

pl:Citi Open 2012 - mężczyźni